The Twelfth Amendment of the Constitution Bill 1992 was a failed proposal to amend the Constitution of Ireland, to exclude the risk of suicide as sufficient reason to legally allow an abortion. It was rejected in a referendum on 25 November 1992.

The Thirteenth and Fourteenth Amendments were approved in referendums on the same day. As these could not be renamed, there has been no enacted Twelfth Amendment of the constitution.

Proposed changes to the text
Proposed insertion of additional text to Article 40.3.3º:

Background
The Eighth Amendment passed in 1983 added the following text to the Constitution as Article 40.3.3º:

In March 1992, the Supreme Court held in Attorney General v. X (commonly known as the X Case), that a 14-year-old girl who had become pregnant as a result of rape could obtain an abortion in circumstances where there was a threat to her life from suicide. This amendment proposed that the possibility of suicide was not a sufficient threat to justify an abortion. The proposal was put to a referendum on 25 November 1992 but was rejected.

On the same day, the Thirteenth Amendment and Fourteenth Amendment were approved by referendum. The former guaranteed freedom of travel abroad to obtain an abortion, and the latter, access to information in Ireland with respect to the same issue. The 1992 general election was held on the same date.

Passage through the Oireachtas
The Twelfth Amendment Bill was proposed in the Dáil by Minister for Justice Pádraig Flynn. The Amendment was approved by the Dáil on 27 October 1992:

Fianna Fáil Senator Des Hanafin, a member of the Pro Life Campaign (PLC), did not vote for the government wording. He proposed an amendment at committee stage proposing the wording supported by the PLC: 

This wording was not voted on, and the bill was approved by the Seanad on 30 October 1992.

Result
The amendment was put to a referendum on 25 November, where it was rejected.

Later developments
No legislation was enacted in the aftermath of this defeated referendum. In 2002, the proposed Twenty-fifth Amendment would have similarly excluded the risk of suicide as grounds for an abortion. On this occasion, the government proposal did have the support of the Pro Life Campaign. This too was rejected in a referendum, but by a much narrower margin.

The European Court of Human Rights found against the state in A, B and C v Ireland (2010). The government responded to this with the enactment of the Protection of Life During Pregnancy Act 2013, which provided for abortion in the cases where there was a risk to the life of the woman, including from a risk of suicide.

See also
Constitutional amendment
History of the Republic of Ireland
November 1992 Irish constitutional referendum
Politics of the Republic of Ireland

References

External links
Referendum (Amendment) (No. 2) Act, 1992
Full text of the Constitution of Ireland

1992 in Irish law
1992 in Irish politics
1992 referendums
12
12
12
Irish abortion referendums
November 1992 events in Europe
Amendment, 12